Joos is a given name. Notable people with the given name include:

Joos Ambühl (born 1959), Swiss cross country skier
Joos de Beer (died 1591), Early Netherlandish painter
Joos van Ghistele (c. 1446–c. 1525), Flemish nobleman 
Joos de Momper (1564–1635), Flemish landscape painter
Joos van Cleve (c. 1485 – 1540/1541), Flemish painter
Joos van Craesbeeck (c. 1605/06– c. 1660), Flemish baker and painter
Joos van Winghe (1544–1603), Flemish Renaissance painter
Joos Valgaeren (born 1976), Belgian international professional footballer

See also
Joos (surname)

Dutch masculine given names